This page gathers the results of elections in Liguria.

Regional elections

Latest regional election

The latest regional election took place on 20–21 September 2020.

Giovanni Toti of Cambiamo!, a minor centre-right party, won handily re-election with 56.1% of the vote. His strongest challenger, Ferruccio Sansa, an independent supported by the centre-left coalition and the Five Star Movement, won 38.9%. Cambiamo! won 22.6%, followed by the Democratic Party (19.9%) and the League (17.1%).

List of previous regional elections
1970 Ligurian regional election
1975 Ligurian regional election
1980 Ligurian regional election
1985 Ligurian regional election
1990 Ligurian regional election
1995 Ligurian regional election
2000 Ligurian regional election
2005 Ligurian regional election
2010 Ligurian regional election
2015 Ligurian regional election

 
Politics of Liguria